Jahan Ara or   is a Muslim female first name in South Asia.

 Jahanara Begum, daughter of Mughal Emperor, Shah Jahan
 Jahanara Imam
 Begum Jahanara Shahnawaz

Other usage
 Jahan Ara; 1964 Bollywood film

See also 
 Jahan

Iranian feminine given names